Yacksel Ríos (born June 27, 1993) is a Puerto Rican professional baseball pitcher for the Atlanta Braves organization. He has played in Major League Baseball (MLB) for the Philadelphia Phillies, Pittsburgh Pirates, Seattle Mariners, and Boston Red Sox. He made his MLB debut in 2017 with the Phillies, who selected him in the 2011 MLB draft.

Baseball career

Philadelphia Phillies
Ríos was born in Caguas, Puerto Rico. He was Philadelphia's 12th-round selection in the 2011 Major League Baseball draft, out of Doctora Conchita Cuevas High School in Gurabo, Puerto Rico. He made his professional debut later that year, with the Gulf Coast League Phillies where he pitched to a 0–1 record, and 8.47 ERA, in  innings. Ríos returned to the GCL in 2012, where he was 2–2 with a 6.60 ERA in 30 innings pitched. In 2013, he played for the Williamsport Crosscutters, where he was 5–3 with a 3.59 ERA in 15 games (including 10 games started). The 2014 season found Ríos pitching for the Lakewood BlueClaws, where he compiled a 6–2 record and 3.69 ERA in  innings pitched.

He spent 2015 with the Clearwater Threshers, where he was 6–5, with a 2.75 ERA, in 26 games (10 starts). The next year, 2016, again found him with Clearwater, the GCL Phillies, and the Reading Fightin Phils, where he was a combined 5–4, with a 5.74 ERA, in 37 games (seven starts). Ríos began 2017 with Reading, then finished that year with the Phillies’ Triple-A farm team, the Lehigh Valley IronPigs; over 37 total minor league appearances that year, he was 1–3, with a 1.92 ERA, with 64 strikeouts, in  innings.

Ríos was called up to the majors for the first time on August 22, 2017. He made his MLB debut that same day, pitching  innings of no-hit baseball against the Miami Marlins. On September 27, Ríos earned his first career win, pitching in relief against the Washington Nationals. He spent the rest of the 2017 season with the Phillies and in 13 games he was 1–0 with a 4.41 ERA. For the 2018 Phillies, Ríos was 3–2, with a 6.75 ERA, in 36 innings pitched. With Lehigh Valley, he was 0–0 with a 3.97 ERA in  innings in which he walked 17 batters and struck out 26 batters. In 2019 with the Phillies, he went 0–0 with a 13.50 ERA in  innings over four games. With the Triple-A Lehigh Valley IronPigs, he was 1–3 with a 7.41 ERA in 34 innings in which he walked 22 batters and struck out 37 batters. He was designated for assignment on July 29, 2019.

Pittsburgh Pirates
On August 3, 2019, Ríos was claimed off waivers by the Pittsburgh Pirates. Pitching for the Indianapolis Indians in 2019 he was 0–0 with one save and a 2.35 ERA in nine games ( innings). Pitching for the Pirates he was 1–0 with a 5.23 ERA in 10 games ( innings). On June 28, 2020, Ríos was outrighted off of the 40-man roster. On August 3, Ríos was selected to the active roster. In three games with Pittsburgh, he pitched to a 9.00 ERA. On October 30, he was again outrighted. He elected free agency that day.

Tampa Bay Rays
On January 21, 2021, Ríos signed a minor league contract with the Tampa Bay Rays organization and was invited to spring training. In 12 games for the Triple-A Durham Bulls, Ríos recorded a 0.66 ERA with 17 strikeouts.

Seattle Mariners
On June 4, 2021, Ríos was traded to the Seattle Mariners in exchange for cash considerations. The next day, his contract was selected to the active roster. Ríos logged a 9.00 ERA in three appearances for Seattle before being designated for assignment on June 11.

Boston Red Sox
On June 14, 2021, Ríos was traded to the Boston Red Sox in exchange for cash considerations. He made his Red Sox debut on June 16, retiring the one batter he faced and earning a win in relief against the Atlanta Braves. He appeared in 20 games with Boston, all in relief, compiling a 3.70 ERA. On September 23, Ríos was designated for assignment by the Red Sox. He cleared waivers and was sent outright to the Triple-A Worcester Red Sox on September 26.

Chicago White Sox
On December 6, 2021, Ríos signed a minor league contract with the Chicago White Sox. He spent the 2022 season with the Triple-A Charlotte Knights, recording a 4-3 record and 4.91 ERA with 38 strikeouts in 33.0 innings pitched. On August 7, 2022, Ríos was released.

Atlanta Braves
On January 6, 2023, Ríos signed a minor league contract with the Atlanta Braves organization.

International career
During the 2023 World Baseball Classic (WBC), Ríos pitched for the Puerto Rico national team.  On March 13, 2023, he pitched in relief versus Israel and retired every batter faced over after José De León tossed  perfect innings. Edwin Díaz, and Duane Underwood Jr. each relieved De León and retired every batter faced, and Martín Maldonado caught on the way to a 10–0 win. The contest ended when Maldonado scored on a walk-off hit in the bottom of the eighth inning that invoked the tournament's mercy rule.  However, it did not qualify as an official perfect game per the Elias Sports Bureau, due to lasting fewer than nine innings.

Notes

References

External links

Yacksel Ríos at Baseball Almanac

1993 births
Living people
People from Caguas, Puerto Rico
Major League Baseball players from Puerto Rico
Major League Baseball pitchers
Philadelphia Phillies players
Pittsburgh Pirates players
Seattle Mariners players
Boston Red Sox players
Florida Complex League Phillies players
Williamsport Crosscutters players
Lakewood BlueClaws players
Cangrejeros de Santurce (baseball) players
Clearwater Threshers players
Glendale Desert Dogs players
Reading Fightin Phils players
Indios de Mayagüez players
Lehigh Valley IronPigs players
Indianapolis Indians players
Worcester Red Sox players
Liga de Béisbol Profesional Roberto Clemente pitchers
2023 World Baseball Classic players